Asansol railway division is one of the four railway divisions under Eastern Railway zone of Indian Railways. This railway division was formed on 1925 and its headquarter is located at Asansol in the state of West Bengal of India. Currently it is the highest revenue generating division of Eastern Railways.

Howrah railway division, Sealdah railway division and Malda railway division are the other railway divisions under ER Zone headquartered at Kolkata.

List of railway stations and towns 
The list includes the stations under the Asansol railway division and their station category.

Stations closed for Passengers -

References

 
Divisions of Indian Railways
1925 establishments in India

Transport in Asansol